Master of the Rings is the sixth studio album by German power metal band Helloween, released in 1994. It is the first to feature new members Andi Deris and Uli Kusch.

This album contains four singles, which are "Where The Rain Grows", "Mr. Ego (Take Me Down)", "Perfect Gentleman", and "Sole Survivor", with corresponding videos for the first three. "Mr. Ego" was dedicated to the band's former singer, Michael Kiske, and was released as an EP in Europe.

Context and recording 
Helloween and vocalist Michael Kiske had reached the end of the road during the touring of 1993's "Chameleon". Michael Kiske's replacement was Andi Deris, formerly with Pink Cream 69.

After an alcohol and drug-related incident in Japan, drummer and co-founder of the band Ingo Schwichtenberg was replaced first by the session-drummer Richie Abdel-Nabi, then on a more permanent basis by former Gamma Ray drummer Uli Kusch, who only arrived when most of the album was already written.

After two highly controversial studios projects and a live album, Helloween parted company with EMI records, aligning themselves with the more modestly sized Raw Power (an imprint of Castle Communications). Nevertheless, the effect of Deris and Kusch was to re-energize their collective fortunes. In Japan, "Master of The Rings" sold more than 120,000 copies.

Commenting on the recording sections for the album, bassist Markus Grosskopf said:

According to Roland Grapow's comments in the liner notes, the lyrics for "Take Me Home" were written by his wife Silvia (the song is simply credited to "Grapow" in the album).

Track listing

Expanded edition (disc 2) track listing 

M – 1 and 2 also appear on the "Mr. Ego" and "Where The Rain Grows" singles.
M – 3, 4 and 5 also appear on the "Perfect Gentleman" single.
M – 6 and 7 also appear on the "Sole Survivor" single.

Personnel

Helloween 
Andi Deris – vocals
Michael Weikath – guitar
Roland Grapow – guitar, lead vocals on "Closer to Home"
Markus Grosskopf – bass
Uli Kusch – drums

Others 
George Chin – photography
Ian Cooper – mastering
Jorn Ellerbrock – programming
Tommy Hansen – production, mixing, programming
Michael Tibes – sound engineering

Charts

Certifications

References 

Helloween albums
1994 albums